David Cadman is a former Vancouver city councillor, first elected in 2002. A social and environmental activist, Cadman is a member of Coalition of Progressive Electors.

Cadman was born in Montreal, Quebec and grew up in Toronto, Ontario. Cadman studied at the University of the South in Tennessee and Geneva in International Development. He later attended the Sorbonne and is fluent in French. Cadman spent several years after university in Tanzania and Kenya developing literacy programs. He returned to Canada in 1976 and settled in British Columbia.

Cadman worked for the Social Planning and Research Council of B.C. and the Greater Vancouver Regional District as a communications director. He later served as president of the Society Promoting Environmental Conservation.

Politics

Cadman ran for Mayor of Vancouver in 1999, endorsed by both the Coalition of Progressive Electors and the Vancouver Green Party, but was defeated by incumbent mayor Philip Owen. In 2002, Cadman was elected council as part of the COPE sweep of that year's municipal elections. Cadman was one of the left-wing "COPE Classic" councillors, and remained with COPE when his centrist colleagues formed Vision Vancouver. He was the only COPE councillor re-elected in 2005, finishing sixth in council balloting.

Since March 2007, Cadman is the President of the international organization 'ICLEI - Local Governments for Sustainability' an international organization of nearly 1000 local governments who have made a commitment to sustainability. In this function he heads the ICLEI Executive Committee, representing the organization to other international bodies.

External links
 Dave Cadman
 David Cadman at Vancouver City Council

Year of birth missing (living people)
Anglophone Quebec people
Living people
Politicians from Montreal
Sewanee: The University of the South alumni
University of Paris alumni
Coalition of Progressive Electors councillors
Canadian expatriates in the United States
Canadian expatriates in France
Canadian expatriates in Switzerland
Canadian expatriates in Tanzania
Canadian expatriates in Kenya